is a Japanese professor of microbiology who works at the  Kagoshima University in Kagoshima, Japan. On May 20, 2013, he was awarded the Gertrude B. Elion Memorial Award by the International Society for Antiviral Research for his research into anti-AIDS drugs.

References

Living people
Japanese microbiologists
Year of birth missing (living people)
Place of birth missing (living people)